The 4th U-boat Flotilla (German 4. Unterseebootsflottille) was formed in May 1941 in Stettin under the command of Kapitänleutnant Werner Jacobsen. Nearly 300 boats received their basic training at the flotilla. The flotilla was disbanded in May 1945.

Flotilla Commanders

U-boats of the Flotilla

References 

04
Military units and formations of the Kriegsmarine
Military units and formations established in 1941
Military units and formations disestablished in 1945